Vasily Nikolayevich Karasev (born April 14, 1971) is a Russian former professional basketball player and coach. He was most recently the head coach of Zenit Saint Petersburg.

Professional playing career
For several years, Karasev was the starting point guard of the Russian League club CSKA Moscow, in the EuroLeague. He also led CSKA to the 1996 EuroLeague Final Four, where he was named to the EuroLeague All-Final Four Team. He was selected to the FIBA EuroStars team in the years 1997, 1998, and 1999. He is widely considered to have been one of the best European point guards of the 1990s.

National team playing career
Karasev was the starting point guard of the senior men's Russian national basketball team, between 1993 and 2003. With Russia's senior national team, Karasev won two EuroBasket medals, the silver medal at the EuroBasket 1993 and the bronze medal at the EuroBasket 1997. He also won two FIBA World Cup silver medals, one at the 1994 FIBA World Championship, and one at the 1998 FIBA World Championship.

At the 1998 FIBA World Championship, he was selected to the All-Tournament Team.

Coaching career
After he retired from playing professional basketball, Karasev began working as a basketball coach. He became the head coach of Triumph Lyubertsy (later renamed to Zenit St. Petersburg), in 2012.

Personal life 
Vasily is the father of Sergey Karasev. Sergey has been a senior Russian national basketball team player, and has played with the pro clubs Triumph Lyubertsy, Canton Charge, Cleveland Cavaliers and Brooklyn Nets (NBA), and Zenit Saint Petersburg.

External links 
FIBA Player Profile
FIBA Europe Player Profile
Euroleague.net Player Profile
EuroCup Coaching Profile

1971 births
Living people
1998 FIBA World Championship players
2002 FIBA World Championship players
Alba Berlin players
Anadolu Efes S.K. players
BC Khimki players
BC Spartak Saint Petersburg players
BC Zenit Saint Petersburg coaches
BC Zenit Saint Petersburg players
Iraklis Thessaloniki B.C. players
PBC CSKA Moscow players
PBC Lokomotiv-Kuban players
PBC Ural Great players
Point guards
Russian basketball coaches
Russian men's basketball players
Shooting guards
Soviet men's basketball players
1994 FIBA World Championship players